The EuroLeague Women is an international basketball club competition for elite women's clubs throughout Europe. The 2007-2008 season features 24 competing teams from 13 different countries. The draw for the groups was held on August 5, 2007, at the Kempinski Hotel in Munich. The competition began on November 7, 2007. The 2008 Final Four is scheduled for April 11–13, 2008.

Group stage

Group A

Knockout stage

Round of 16

Round of 8

 if necessary

External links
  FIBA Europe website
  EuroLeague Women official website

Fenerbahçe Basketball